Walter Hanl (born 3 April 1964) is an Austrian Paralympic judoka. He represented Austria at the 1996 Summer Paralympics held in Atlanta, United States and at the 2000 Summer Paralympics held in Sydney, Australia. He won two medals: the gold medal in the men's +95 kg event in 1996 and the silver medal in the men's 100 kg event in 2000.

References

External links 
 

Living people
1964 births
Place of birth missing (living people)
Austrian male judoka
Judoka at the 1996 Summer Paralympics
Judoka at the 2000 Summer Paralympics
Medalists at the 1996 Summer Paralympics
Medalists at the 2000 Summer Paralympics
Paralympic gold medalists for Austria
Paralympic silver medalists for Austria
Paralympic medalists in judo
Paralympic judoka of Austria
20th-century Austrian people
21st-century Austrian people